The fourth season of Adventure Time, an American animated television series created by Pendleton Ward, premiered on Cartoon Network on April 2, 2012 and concluded on October 22, 2012, and was produced by Frederator Studios and Cartoon Network Studios. The season follows the adventures of Finn, a human boy, and his best friend and adoptive brother Jake, a dog with magical powers to change shape and size at will. Finn and Jake live in the post-apocalyptic Land of Ooo, where they interact with the other main characters of the show: Princess Bubblegum, The Ice King, Marceline the Vampire Queen, Lumpy Space Princess, BMO, and Flame Princess.

During the production of the season Ward and the series' crew sought to over come what they called the "season four blues" by writing more interesting and different stories than what had previously aired. The season was storyboarded and written by Cole Sanchez, Rebecca Sugar, Tom Herpich, Skyler Page, Ako Castuera, Jesse Moynihan, Bert Youn, Somvilay Xayaphone, and Steve Wolfhard.

The first episode of the season, "Hot to the Touch" was watched by 2.655 million viewers; this marked a slight decrease in viewers watching Cartoon Network when compared to the previous season's debut. The season ended with the cliffhanger "The Lich", which was viewed by 2.589 million viewers; the story was resolved at the start of season five. The season was met with largely positive critical reception. In addition, several episodes were nominated for awards; the episodes "Princess Cookie", "The Hard Easy", "Lady & Peebles", and "Goliad" were all nominated for Annie Awards. The episode "Card Wars" won a Golden Reel Award. Several compilation DVDs that contained episodes from the season were released after the season finished airing. The full season set was released on October 7, 2014 on DVD and Blu-ray.

Development

Concept
The season follows the adventures of Finn the Human, a human boy, and his best friend and adoptive brother Jake, a dog with magical powers to change shape and grow and shrink at will. Finn and Jake live in the post-apocalyptic Land of Ooo, wherein they interact with the other major characters, including: Princess Bubblegum, The Ice King, Marceline the Vampire Queen, Lumpy Space Princess, BMO, and Flame Princess. Common storylines revolve around: Finn and Jake discovering strange creatures, battling the Ice King, and battling monsters in order to help others. Multi-episode storylines for this season include Finn attempting to woo Flame Princess, and the Lich using the Enchiridion to open a multidimensional portal in his quest to destroy all life in the multiverse.

Production
On April 6, 2011, Eric Homan announced through Frederator's official blog that, although he was unable to "confirm nor deny" whether the series had been renewed for a fourth season, "if there were a fourth season planned [...] writing would begin next week." On April 28, 2011, Ward officially announced that, with the storyboards for season three nearing completion, much of the production staff had shifted its focus onto the show's fourth season. The first episode to enter into production was "Five Short Graybles", based on its production number. However, it was later the second episode aired.

During the writing for the season, Ward and series' head writer Kent Osborne noted that it was increasingly difficult to produce new episode concepts because the writers had "already used a lot of cool ideas". Osborne called this slump the "season four blues". Ward went on to clarify that, "everything's still coming out super weird and interesting—but it just gets a little harder. You have to dig deeper." To combat these issues, the writer staff tried different story writing methods, such as a technique called exquisite corpse, in which one writer starts a story on a sheet of paper, and the paper is folded and another writer tries to finish it. Ward, however, noted that "the ideas are usually terrible". They also decided to experiment with different types of storytelling and to introduce more new characters to the show.

This season's episodes were produced in a process similar to those of the previous seasons. Each episode was outlined in two-to-three pages that contained the necessary plot information. These outlines were then handed to storyboard artists, who created full storyboards. Design and coloring were done at Cartoon Network Studios in Burbank, California, and animation was handled overseas in South Korea by Rough Draft Korea and Saerom Animation. The season was storyboarded and written by Cole Sanchez, Rebecca Sugar, Tom Herpich, Skyler Page, Ako Castuera, Moynihan, Bert Youn, Somvilay Xayaphone, and Steve Wolfhard. Ward was proud with the writing staff for the season, saying, "Everyone [on the writing staff] is super talented [...] And they're all a bunch of brainiacs, super smart". He explained that "They're amazing in helping us because they let us write really cool ideas [because] they're really supportive, is what I am trying to say, of what we're trying to do."

Cast

The voice actors for the season include: Jeremy Shada (Finn the Human), John DiMaggio (Jake the Dog), Tom Kenny (The Ice King), Hynden Walch (Princess Bubblegum), and Olivia Olson (Marceline the Vampire Queen). Ward himself provides the voice for several minor characters, as well as Lumpy Space Princess. Former storyboard artist Niki Yang voices the sentient video game console BMO, as well as Jake's girlfriend Lady Rainicorn in Korean. Polly Lou Livingston, a friend of Pendleton Ward's mother, Bettie Ward, plays the voice of the small elephant Tree Trunks. Jessica DiCicco voices Flame Princess, who becomes Finn's new romantic interest. Season four also features the reappearance of The Lich, the series' principal antagonist. The Lich is portrayed by Ron Perlman. The Adventure Time cast records their lines together as opposed to doing it individually. This is to capture more natural sounding dialogue among the characters. Hynden Walch has described these group session as akin to "doing a play reading—a really, really out there play."

Several voice actors and actresses reprise their characters in this season. Andy Milonakis returns as N.E.P.T.R. in "Hot to the Touch" and "BMO Noire". Ron Lynch again voices Pig in "Dream of Love". Martin Olson reprises his role as Hunson Abadeer in the two-parter episode "Return to the Nightosphere" / "Daddy's Little Monster". Miguel Ferrer voices Death in "Sons of Mars". In the same episode, Ward voices Abraham Lincoln, a throw-back to the series' pilot episode. Erik Estrada again voices the titular character in "King Worm". George Takei voices the anthropomorphic heart villain Ricardio in "Lady & Peebles". Justin Roiland returns as the Earl of Lemongrab in "You Made Me"; the episode would also see him voice Lemongrab's genetically created twin. Keith David once again voices the Flame King in "Ignition Point". Lou Ferrigno returns in "The Lich" to voice Billy.

Emo Philips makes his debut as Cuber in the episode "Five Short Graybles". Bobcat Goldthwait and Susie Essman voice the spider couple in "Web Weirdos". Writer Graham Linehan's daughter Wendy appears as the titular character in "Goliad", and Linehan's son Henry voices Stormo. Donald Faison lends his voice to the character Baby-Snaps in "Princess Cookie". Tom Gammill, Melissa Villaseñor, Kenny, and Ferrer voice the four-headed deity Grob Gob Glob Grod in "Sons of Mars". Matthew Broderick voices the Dream Warrior in "Who Would Win", and Gammill returns in the same episode as The Farm. Paul F. Tompkins appears as Furnius in "Ignition Point". Both Brian Doyle-Murray and Jonathan Katz lend their voices to the episode "The Hard Easy" as Prince Huge and the Mud Scamp elder, respectively. Katz was originally supposed to voice a character in the previous season, but had to bow out due to a scheduling conflict.

Various other characters are voiced by Tom Kenny, Dee Bradley Baker, Maria Bamford, Steve Little, and Kent Osborne.

Broadcast and reception

Ratings
The season debuted on April 2, 2012, with the episode "Hot to the Touch". The episode was watched by 2.655 million viewers. This marked a slight decrease from the third-season premiere, which had been viewed by 2.686 million viewers. The episode was number one among kids aged 2–11, 6–11, and 9–14, as well as boys aged 2–11, 6–11 and 9–14. The season's sixteenth episode, "Burning Low" was seen by 3.504 million viewers, making it the most-watched episode of the series to air. The twenty-third episode of the season, "The Hard Easy", was the 100th episode produced of the entire show, although it was the 101st aired. It aired on October 1, 2012. The season finale, "The Lich", aired on October 22, 2012, and was viewed by 2.589. It ranked as the number one television episode in its timeslot among all kids aged 2–11, 6–11, and 9–14, and all boy demographics. This season moved to Mondays at 7:30 pm. The first three seasons aired on Mondays at 8:00 pm.

Reviews and accolades
Mike LeChevallier of Slant Magazine awarded the fourth season of the show four stars out of five. In the review, LeChevallier positively complimented the show for "growing up" with its characters, and that "the show's dialogue is among the best of any current animated series." He concluded that the series possesses "strikingly few faults". Season four was the first season that was reviewed by The A.V. Club; reviewer Oliver Sava wrote that in its fourth year, the show "transformed into a different beast" and that it was the show's "strongest season yet". Each episode was graded by The A.V. Club with a different letter grade; the season received three C's, eight B's, and thirteen A's.

Four of the season's episodes were nominated for Annie Awards. "Princess Cookie" was nominated Best Animated Television Production For Children, "The Hard Easy" was nominated for Design in an Animated Television/Broadcast Production, and "Lady & Peebles" and "Goliad" were both nominated Storyboarding in an Animated Television/Broadcast Production. None of the episodes managed to win, however. The episode "Card Wars" won a Golden Reel Award for Best Sound Editing: Sound Effects, Foley, Dialogue and ADR Animation in Television.

Episodes

Home media
Warner Home Video released multiple DVD volumes, such as Jake vs. Me-Mow, Fionna and Cake, Jake the Dad, The Suitor, Princess Day, Finn the Human, Frost & Fire, The Enchiridion, and Card Wars which contain episodes from the fourth season. All DVD releases can be purchased on the Cartoon Network Shop, and the individual episodes can be downloaded from both the iTunes Store and Amazon.com.

Full season release
The full season set was released on DVD and Blu-ray on October 7, 2014.

Notes

References

2012 American television seasons
Adventure Time seasons